Flesh and Bone is an American drama television miniseries created by Moira Walley-Beckett. It premiered on November 8, 2015, on the American cable television network Starz. Ethan Stiefel was a consultant and choreographer on the series.

Plot
The founder and temperamental artistic director of the American Ballet Company, Paul Grayson (Ben Daniels), is determined to make it rank among the world's best artistic institutions. As the company's aging prima ballerina, Kiira (Irina Dvorovenko) struggles with an injury, Grayson believes that the company's saving grace is Claire Robbins (Sarah Hay), a beautiful and talented ballet dancer with a troubled past, whose inner torment drives her in compelling, unforeseeable ways. The series explores the dysfunction and glamour of the ballet world.

Cast

Main
 Sarah Hay as Claire Robbins, a beautiful and talented ballet dancer with a troubled past.
 Ben Daniels as Paul Grayson, an Artistic Director of the American Ballet Company.
 Emily Tyra as Mia Bialy, Claire's reluctant roommate who has an eating disorder.
 Irina Dvorovenko as Kiira, an aging prima ballerina struggling with an injury.
 Damon Herriman as Romeo, a homeless man who lives under Claire's building.
 Josh Helman as Bryan Robbins, Claire's brother and a former Marine. 
 Raychel Diane Weiner as Daphne Kensington, an ambitious New Yorker from a privileged background.
 Marina Benedict as Toni Cannava, The American Ballet Company's transcendent new choreographer.
 Tina Benko as Jessica, the manager of the American Ballet Company.
 Sascha Radetsky as Ross, a womanizing principal dancer.
 Karell Williams as Trey, a struggling ballet dancer.

Supporting
 Tovah Feldshuh as Ivana, a ballet instructor.
 John Allee as Pasha, the ballet company's piano player.
 Vanessa Aspillaga as Monica, the assistant company manager of the American Ballet Company.
 Carling Talcott as Ashley.
 Nadezhda Vostrikov as Patrice, a jealous ballet dancer in the company.

Episodes
Starz released the first episode online on November 2, 2015, and the remaining episodes were made available on November 8, 2015, through Starz's On Demand channel in addition to the channel's weekly sequential airing of episodes.

Reception
Flesh and Bone received mixed to positive reviews. Rotten Tomatoes gives a "Fresh" score of 60%, which is an average rating of 5.9 out of 10, sampled from 35 reviews. The consensus reads: "Its nuanced female relationships makes Flesh and Bone a realistic portrayal of a professional ballet company, though it suffers from a lack of levity." On another review aggregator, Metacritic, the miniseries holds a score of 52 out of 100, calculated from 19 critics, signifying "mixed or average reviews".  For the 2016 Writers Guild of America Awards, the series was nominated for Long Form Original. For the 73rd Golden Globe Awards, the series was nominated for Best Limited Series or Motion Picture Made for Television and Sarah Hay for Best Actress in a Limited Series or Motion Picture Made for Television.

References

External links
 

2010s American drama television miniseries
2015 American television series debuts
2015 American television series endings
English-language television shows
Starz original programming
Television series about ballet